The New World is a 2011 Estonian documentary film about New World Society, a citizens' initiative in Uus Maailm, Tallinn, that aims to remake neighbourhoods and change people's lives. Written and directed by Jaan Tootsen, it was presented with the award for Best Film by the Estonian Association of Film Journalists.

References

External links
 

2011 films
2011 in Estonia
2011 documentary films
Estonian-language films
Culture in Tallinn
Documentary films about politics
Documentary films about urban studies
Politics of Estonia
Kesklinn, Tallinn
Estonian documentary films